USC&GS Cosmos was a survey launch in service in the United States Coast and Geodetic Survey from 1887 to 1927.

Cosmos was built in 1887 by the Mare Island Navy Yard at Vallejo, California. She entered service with the Coast and Geodetic Survey that year. She served along the United States West Coast and in the waters of the Territory of Alaska during her career.

On 29–30 April 1913, Cosmos joined the Coast and Geodetic Survey survey ship USC&GS Thomas R. Gedney and Launch 117 in helping to pull the Pacific Coast Steamship Company ship Curacao off Boulder Spit on Fish Egg Island in Alaska.

Cosmos was retired from service in 1927 and sold for $565 (USD) that year.

References
NOAA History, A Science Odyssey: Tools of the Trade: Coast and Geodetic Survey Ships: Cosmos
NOAA History, A Science Odyssey: Hall of Honor: Lifesaving and the Protection of Property by the Coast & Geodetic Survey 1845-1937

Ships of the United States Coast and Geodetic Survey
Survey ships of the United States
Ships built in Vallejo, California
1887 ships